PDM may stand for:

Computing 

 .pdm (disambiguation), several file formats
 Personal data manager - portable hardware tool enabling secure storage and easy access to user data
 Phase dispersion minimization, a data analysis technique for finding periodic components in time series data
 Physical data model, a representation of a data design as implemented, or intended to be implemented, in a database management system
 Point distribution model, deformable contour model (used in Computer Vision)
 Programming Development Manager
 Protocol-dependent module, decision making about routing table entries 
 Pulse-density modulation, a form of modulation used in analog to digital conversions
 Product Data Management, Product data management (PDM) or Product information management (PIM) is the business function often within product lifecycle management (PLM)

Politics 

 Democratic Party of Moldova, a political party of Moldova
 Mexican Democratic Party a former political party in Mexico
 Pakistan Democratic Movement, an anti-establishment coalition of political parties in Pakistan 
 Party-directed mediation, a mediation approach that relies heavily on pre-caucus and joint sessions
 People's Democratic Movement, a political party of Papua New Guinea
 People's Democratic Movement (Dominica), a political party of Dominica
 People's Democratic Movement (Montserrat), a political party of Montserrat
 People's Democratic Movement (Turks and Caicos Islands), a political party of the Turks and Caicos Islands
 Southern Democratic Party a former political party in Calabria, Italy
 Participative Decision Making,

Others 

 École Polyvalente Deux-Montagnes, a high school in Deux-Montagnes, Quebec, Canada
 Partial-propensity direct method, a stochastic simulation algorithm for chemical reaction networks
 PDM (cycling team), the cycling team sponsored by Philips Dupont Magnetics
 PDM Group of Institutions (popularly known as PDM)  is a Group of Educational Institutions located in  India
 Penny-drop moment, an abbreviation used by cryptic crossword bloggers
 Philips Dupont Magnetics, a joint venture between Philips and DuPont
 Ponta da Madeira, an enormous deep-water port in northern Brazil
 Polarization-division multiplexing
 Post-detonation material such as trinitite formed following nuclear weapon detonations
 Prague Daily Monitor, a newspaper published in the Czech Republic
 Precedence Diagram Method, a project scheduling technique
 Predictive maintenance, a method for planning equipment maintenance based on their condition
 Public Domain Mark, a way of distinguishing works that are free of known copyright 
 Psychodynamic Diagnostic Manual, a psychoanalytically-oriented manual for use by mental health professionals
 PDM-A, modernized version of the RPO-A reactive flamethrower
 M86 Pursuit Deterrent Munition, a type of anti-personnel mine produced in US
 Personal Diabetes Manager a machine used for giving insulin to diabetics